Bent Pedersen (born 24 July 1945) is a Danish former cyclist. He competed at the 1972 Summer Olympics and 1976 Summer Olympics.

References

External links
 

1945 births
Living people
Danish male cyclists
Olympic cyclists of Denmark
Cyclists at the 1972 Summer Olympics
Cyclists at the 1976 Summer Olympics
Sportspeople from the Capital Region of Denmark